Wolfgang Händler (11 December 1920 in Potsdam – 19 February 1998) was a German mathematician, pioneering computer scientist and professor at Leibniz University Hannover (Lehrstuhl für elektronische Rechenanlagen) and University of Erlangen–Nuremberg (Institut für Mathematische Maschinen und Datenverarbeitung) known for his work on automata theory, parallel computing, artificial intelligence, man-machine interfaces and computer graphics. 

 Händler diagram (aka Mn graph) (1958)

See also
 Händler's minimization graph
 Telefunken
 BESK
 
 

 SUPRENUM (Supercomputer for Numerical Application)

  (ECS)
 Feng's classification
 Flynn's taxonomy
 Alwin Walther
 
 
 Arthur Burks
 Konrad Zuse

References

Further reading

External links
 http://www.universitaetssammlungen.de/person/670
 
 Author profile in the database zbMATH

1920 births
1998 deaths
20th-century German mathematicians
German computer scientists
People from Potsdam
Computer science educators
Gdańsk University of Technology alumni
University of Kiel alumni
Technische Universität Darmstadt alumni
Academic staff of Saarland University
Academic staff of the University of Hanover
Academic staff of the University of Erlangen-Nuremberg